Justus Thigpen (born August 13, 1947) is an American former professional basketball player.

Career 
Thigpen was selected by the San Diego Rockets in the 11th round of the 1969 NBA draft.

Thigpen played for the following teams: Pittsburgh Pipers (1969–70 ABA season), Detroit Pistons (1972–73 NBA season), and Kansas City-Omaha Kings (1973–74 NBA season).

In 1972–73, he was playing for the Flint Pros of the Continental Basketball Association when he signed with Detroit. In the 1973–74 season, he was again playing for Flint before he joined Kansas City-Omaha for three weeks. After his stint with the Kings, he learned that the Pros had folded.

A 6'1" guard, Thigpen played college basketball at Weber State University.

References

External links 
 Career NBA stats @ basketball-reference.com
 Greater Flint AA HOF profile

1947 births
Living people
American men's basketball players
Basketball players from Flint, Michigan
Detroit Pistons players
Junior college men's basketball players in the United States
Kansas City Kings players
Pittsburgh Pipers players
Point guards
San Diego Rockets draft picks
Weber State Wildcats men's basketball players